St. Vincent's Hospital was a Catholic hospital in Normandy, Missouri.

In 1858 the Sisters of Charity founded St. Vincent's Sanitarium for those with nervous and mental diseases. The hospital was located on St. Vincent's Lane north of St. Charles Rock Road; it is the current home of the Castle Park Apartments.

It opened in August 1858 at Ninth and Marion Streets in St. Louis with four patients and fifteen sisters.

In 1895, the home relocated to St. Vincent's Lane (the current Castle Park Drive), up a hilltop from the Rock Road in St. Louis County. This massive, castle-like building was listed on the National Register of Historic Places.

The 1930 St. Louis Census lists 357 individuals.

The home was in part financed by the patients' fees. By 1941 the home was operated by the Daughters of Charity of St. Vincent de Paul for the treatment of mental and nervous disorders as well as selected cases of alcoholism and drug addiction. The home remained in existence until the 1980s.

The Census collection consists of three record books of the St. Vincent's Institution for the Insane: cash ledger, 1858–1867; contracts of obligations for patients, 1859-circa 1890; and record of doctors' prescriptions for patients, 1901-1904. It can be cited as, "Records of Saint Vincent's Institution for the Insane, Missouri Historical Society, St. Louis".

Notes

External links
1930 St. Louis Census - St. Vincent's Sanitarium
St. Vincent's Hospital Archives - Missouri History Museum
"Clocations" - Location Map

Hospital buildings completed in 1894
Renaissance Revival architecture in Missouri
Religious buildings and structures completed in 1891
Hospitals established in 1858
Buildings and structures in St. Louis County, Missouri
Defunct hospitals in Missouri
Healthcare in St. Louis County, Missouri
Catholic hospitals in North America
Hospital buildings on the National Register of Historic Places in Missouri
1858 establishments in Missouri
National Register of Historic Places in St. Louis County, Missouri
Catholic health care